The Central Park Concert is a 2003 live album by the American rock group, Dave Matthews Band, recorded in Central Park, New York City. The concert attracted more than 120,000 people, which makes it the biggest audience to attend a Dave Matthews Band concert.

Track listing
Disc one
 "Don't Drink the Water" (Matthews) – 10:09
 "So Much to Say" (Griesar, Matthews, Tinsley) – 4:14
 "Anyone Seen the Bridge?" » "Too Much" (Beauford, Lessard, Matthews, Moore, Tinsley) – 6:41
 "Granny" (Matthews) – 4:32
 "Crush" (Matthews) – 11:19
 "When the World Ends" (Ballard, Matthews) – 3:54

Disc two
"Dancing Nancies" (Matthews) – 9:44
 "Warehouse" (Matthews) – 9:40
 "Ants Marching" (Matthews) – 5:51
 "Rhyme & Reason" (Matthews) – 5:36
 "Two Step" (Matthews) – 18:56
 "Help Myself" (Matthews) – 5:22

Disc three
"Cortez the Killer" (Young) – 10:52
featuring Warren Haynes on guitar and vocals
 "Jimi Thing" (Matthews) – 16:39featuring Warren Haynes on guitarincludes an interpolation of "For What It's Worth" "What Would You Say" (Matthews) – 5:27
 "Where Are You Going" (Matthews) – 3:53
 "All Along the Watchtower" (Dylan) – 12:59features a bass guitar intro jam of "The Star-Spangled Banner" by Stefan Lessard
 "Grey Street" (Matthews) – 4:58
 "What You Are" (Ballard, Matthews) – 6:40
 "Stay (Wasting Time)" (Lessard, Matthews, Moore) – 6:59

DVD track listing
Disc one
Prelude »
"Don't Drink the Water"
"So Much to Say" » "Anyone Seen the Bridge?"
"Too Much"
"Granny"
"Crush"
"When the World Ends"
"Dancing Nancies" »
"Warehouse"
"Ants Marching"
"Rhyme & Reason"
"Two Step"

Disc two
"Help Myself"
"Cortez, the Killer"
"Jimi Thing"
"What Would You Say"
"Where Are You Going"
"All Along the Watchtower"
"Grey Street"
"What You Are"
"Stay (Wasting Time)"

Personnel
Dave Matthews Band
Carter Beauford — percussion, drums, backup vocals
Stefan Lessard — bass guitar
Dave Matthews — guitars, vocals
LeRoi Moore — saxophones, backup vocals
Boyd Tinsley — violin, backup vocals

Additional musicians
Butch Taylor — keyboards, backup vocals
Warren Haynes — guitar, vocals

Charts

Weekly charts

Year-end charts

Certifications

References

External links
 
The Dave Matthews Band in Central Park: The AOL Concert for Schools official website (archive)

Dave Matthews Band video albums
Albums produced by John Alagía
Dave Matthews Band live albums
2003 video albums
Live video albums
2003 live albums
Albums recorded at Central Park
RCA Records live albums
RCA Records video albums